The History of Michigan Wolverines football in the Crisler years covers the history of the University of Michigan Wolverines football program during the period from the hiring of Fritz Crisler as head coach in 1938 through his retirement as head coach after winning the 1948 Rose Bowl. Michigan was a member of the Big Ten Conference during the Crisler years and played its home games at Michigan Stadium.

During the 10 years in which Crisler served as head football coach, Michigan compiled a record of 71–16–3. Tom Harmon played for the Wolverines from 1938 to 1940 and in 1940 became the first Michigan player to win the Heisman Trophy.   The 1947 Michigan team, sometimes known as the "Mad Magicians", compiled a perfect 10–0 record, outscored its opponents 394–53, defeated the USC Trojans 49–0 in the 1948 Rose Bowl game, and were selected as the nation's No. 1 team by a 226–119 margin over Notre Dame in an unprecedented AP Poll taken after the bowl games.  Bob Chappuis finished second in the Heisman Trophy voting in 1947.

Eleven players from the Crisler years have been inducted into the College Football Hall of Fame.  They are Chappuis, Bump Elliott, Pete Elliott, Harmon, Bob Westfall, Elroy "Crazy Legs" Hirsch, Forest Evashevski (inducted as a coach), David M. Nelson (inducted as coach), Tubby Raymond (inducted as coach), Albert "Ox" Wistert, and Alvin "Moose" Wistert.  Two have also been inducted into the Pro Football Hall of Fame — Hirsch and Len Ford.  Three members of the coaching staff have also been inducted into the College Football Hall of Fame.  They are Crisler, Clarence "Biggie" Munn, and Bennie Oosterbaan (inducted as player).

Year-by-year results

Overview of the Crisler years

Harmon years

War years

Mad Magicians

Rivalries

Michigan State
Crisler is the only head coach in Michigan football history who served for more than two years and maintained an undefeated record in the  Michigan – Michigan State football rivalry.  Crisler compiled a perfect 8–0 record against the Spartans, including four shutouts in 1938 (14–0), 1942 (20–0), 1945 (40–0), and 1946 (55–0).  Biggie Munn, who was an assistant coach under Crisler from 1938 to 1945, served as head coach at Michigan State from 1947 to 1953 and as athletic director from 1954 to 1971.

Minnesota
During the Crisler years, Michigan compiled a 5–5 record in its annual Little Brown Jug rivalry game with the Minnesota Golden Gophers.  Minnesota defeated Michigan five straight years in the first half of the Crisler years.  Under head coach Bernie Bierman, Minnesota compiled a nine-game winning streak over Michigan extending from 1934 to 1942.  By the mid-1940s, with Bierman gone as head coach, the Golden Gophers fell from the top tier of teams, and Michigan concluded the Crisler years with five consecutive victories from 1943 to 1947.

During the Crisler years, the Little Brown Jug games often took on national significance, as the two teams  came into several games ranked among the top teams in the country.  Significant games include the following:

In 1938, Minnesota was responsible for Michigan's only loss in the first season under Crisler.  The Golden Gophers won a close game by a score of 7 to 6.  Minnesota and Michigan ended the 1938 season ranked #10 and #16 in the final AP poll.
In 1940, Michigan and Minnesota were undefeated and ranked #2 and #3 in the AP poll before the game.   Michigan took the lead on a touchdown pass from Tom Harmon to Forest Evashevski, but Harmon's kick for the extra point went wide. Minnesota responded with its own touchdown and converted its extra point attempt to win the game by a 7–6 score.  Minnesota finished the 1940 season undefeated and with a national championship.  Michigan was ranked #3 in the final AP Poll of 1940.
In 1941, the teams were again undefeated heading into the game.  Minnesota won the game 7–0.  Minnesota went on to claim its second consecutive national championship, and Michigan was ranked #5 in the final AP poll.
In 1947, the Wolverines were ranked #1 in the country and had averaged 55 points in the first four games of the season.  The Golden Gophers gave the Wolverines the toughest game of the season.  Michigan's star back Bob Chappuis was held to 26 rushing yards, less than two yards per carry.   While the Wolverines won, 13 to 6, the close score resulted in Notre Dame moving ahead of Michigan to claim the #1 spot in the AP Poll.

Notre Dame
After a 30-year hiatus in the Michigan–Notre Dame football rivalry from 1910 through 1941, the two teams met in 1942 and 1943.

In 1942, Notre Dame came into the game ranked #4 in the AP Poll, and Michigan was ranked #6.  Michigan won the game, 32–20, in front of a capacity crowd of 57,500 at Notre Dame Stadium.  Michigan's total of 32 points was the most scored against a Notre Dame team since 1905.  Michigan's first touchdown came on a quarterback sneak by George Ceithaml from the one-yard line.  Don Robinson ran for Michigan's second touchdown on a fake field goal attempt, and Tom Kuzma scored two touchdowns in the second half.
In 1943, the teams came into the game with undefeated records and ranked #1 and #2 in the AP Poll. The highly anticipated game broke the Michigan Stadium attendance records with a crowd of 85,688. The previous record was a crowd of 85,088 that attended the 1929 Michigan-Ohio State game.  Notre Dame won the game, 35–12. According to the United Press game account, the passing by Angelo Bertelli (1943 Heisman Trophy winner) "caught the Wolverine secondary flatfooted and out of position repeatedly to make the rout complete." The third quarter was marked by a malfunction of the electric clock, resulting in a third quarter that lasted 23 minutes.  Notre Dame outscored Michigan 14–0 in the long third quarter.  After nine plays had been run in the fourth quarter, the timing error was discovered, and an announcement was made over the stadium's public address system that only two-and-a-half minutes remained in the game, as the fourth quarter was shortened to seven minutes.  The only points in the short fourth quarter came on the last play of the game as Elroy Hirsch threw a 13-yard touchdown pass to Paul White. Dame went on to win the 1943 national championship.

After the 1943 game, the programs did not meet again until 1978.

Ohio State
During the Crisler years, Michigan compiled a 6-2-1 record in the Michigan–Ohio State football rivalry.  Significant games during the Crisler years include:

In 1939, Ohio State came into the game ranked #6 in the country with Michigan unranked and having two losses.  The Wolverines upset the Buckeyes, 21–14.
In 1940, the game marked the final college football game to be played by Tom Harmon after three brilliant years for the Wolverines.  Michigan defeated Ohio State 40–0.  Harmon ran for three touchdowns, threw two touchdown passes, and converted four PATs.  He also averaged 50 yards per punt on three punts.  When Harmon left the field with 38 seconds remaining, the crowd in Columbus gave a standing ovation to a Michigan football player.
In 1942, the teams came into the game ranked #4 and #5 in the AP poll.  The Buckeyes won the game, 21 to 7, in Ann Arbor.  The victory over the Wolverines helped propel Ohio State to the #1 spot in the final AP Poll, as Ohio State won its first national championship.
In 1944, Ohio State came into the game ranked #3 and undefeated.  Michigan was ranked #6 and had one loss.  The Buckeyes defeated the Wolverines, 18–14, in Columbus.  Ohio State narrowly missed its second national championship, being ranked #2 in the final AP Poll.
In 1945, both teams were ranked among the top ten in the AP Poll, and Michigan won, 7–3.

Coaching staff and administration

Assistant coaches
William Barclay – assistant coach, 1943–1945
Jack Blott – assistant coach, 1924–1933, 1946–1958 (head football coach at Wesleyan, 1934–1940)
George Ceithaml – assistant coach, 1947–1952
Campbell Dickson – assistant coach, 1938–1939
Ray Fisher – assistant coach, 1921–1928, 1934–1936, 1943–1945 (also Michigan's head baseball coach, 1921–1958)
Forrest Jordan – assistant coach, 1946–1947
Cliff Keen – assistant coach 1926–1930, 1932–1936, 1941, 1946–1958 (also Michigan's wrestling coach, 1925–1970)
Archie Kodros – player, 1937–1939; assistant coach, 1940–1941 (later head football coach at Whitman, 1949–1950, and Hawaii, 1951)
Earl Martineau – assistant coach, 1938–1945 (head coach at Western Michigan, 1924–1928)
Ernie McCoy, 1940–1942, 1945–1951 (also Michigan's head basketball coach, 1948–1952; athletic director at Penn State, 1952–1970)
Clarence "Biggie" Munn – assistant coach, 1938–1945 (later head coach at Syracuse, 1946, and Michigan State, 1947–1953)
Bennie Oosterbaan – assistant coach, 1928–1947 (also Michigan's head basketball coach, 1938–1946, and head football coach, 1948–1958)
Hercules Renda – halfback, 1937–1939; assistant coach, 1940–1941
Arthur Valpey – end, 1935–1937; assistant coach, 1943–1947 (later head coach at Harvard, 1948–1949, and Connecticut, 1950–1951)
Wally Weber – assistant coach, 1931–1958

Others
Ralph W. Aigler – chairman of Michigan's Faculty Board in Control of Athletics, 1917–1942, faculty representative to the Big Ten Conference, 1917–1955
Charles B. Hoyt – trainer, 1941–1942
Jim Hunt – trainer, 1947–1967
Ray Roberts – trainer, 1930–1940, 1943–1946

Players

References

Michigan Wolverines football in the Crisler years
Michigan Wolverines football